Mooch Goes to Hollywood (aka Mooch) is a 1971 51-minute television film was directed by Richard Erdman and co-written by Jim Backus, who also stars in the film as himself. The film chronicles the adventures of Mooch, an ambitious dog, and her attempts to become a canine star after befriending Zsa Zsa Gabor.

Plot
Mooch, a young canine starlet, sets off for Hollywood. After befriending Zsa Zsa Gabor, her new friend provides the pooch with the "skinny" on the ins and outs of achieving Hollywood fame. Wandering through the famous haunts of tinseltown, Mooch comes across Vincent Price at the Brown Derby and ends up in his Jeep. Price wants to give the dog to a young admirer and takes Mooch to a veterinarian for a check-up. When his new owner leaves, Mooch is frightened by Dr. Hackett and bolts for the door, but is not able to catch up with Price driving away.

After checking out the psychedelic scene where she  meets Phyllis Diller,  her wandering takes Mooch to Dino's Lounge on Sunset Strip in West Hollywood and then to the Playboy Club in downtown Los Angeles. Rejected as a Playboy bunny, but still on the lookout for famous haunts, Mooch discovers Michaelangelo's Wigs where she has visions of a glamorous new look. Continuing on past the Classic Cat Club, Mooch encounters James Darren at an outdoor garage, and feigns an injury to get his attention. On a trip to the seashore, new adventures await with new friends.  Hoping to land a contract, Mooch tags along with two girls being discovered by a producer Jerry Hausner. Ending up back at the veterinarian, Mooch joins a wild menagerie of animals waiting for Dr. Hackett.

Placed in the veterinarian's kennel, Mooch makes his escape and heads for Paragon Studios. On his tour of the back lots, famous catch phrases waft through the air. After interrupting a wild west shooting scene, Mooch sneaks into the dressing room of Jill St. John. Taking her turn in the hairdresser's chair, the young starlet finds her way to a recording session with Jim Backus, playing Mr. Magoo, who needs a dog for an upcoming production. He becomes her next master, taking Mooch home to meet his wife Henny, and the many friends arriving for a garden party, including all of Mooch's former owners.

Finally making one last attempt at achieving stardom, Mooch checks out a Hollywood estate and jumps aboard the owner's car. It turns out to be Dr. Hackett who ultimately adopts the stray.

Cast 

 Higgins the Dog as Mooch
 Vincent Price as himself
 James Darren as himself
 Jill St. John  as herself
 Jim Backus  as himself
 James Harding as Veterinarian Dr. Hackett
 Kim Hamilton as Nurse
 Gino Conforti as Hairdresser Mr. Oz
 Jerry Hausner as Producer
 Bert Holland as Attendant
 Grace Albertson as Lady with Cat
 Jay Jostyn as man with Duck
 Lynne Lipton as voice of Mooch
 Zsa Zsa Gabor as narrator

Production
Mooch is played by Higgins the Dog, best known for his roles as "Dog" in the television series Petticoat Junction and as the title character in Benji. Mooch Goes to Hollywood is narrated by Richard Burton, who co-starred with Backus in the 1959 cinematic adaptation of Edna Ferber's Ice Palace. Later narration is by Zsa Zsa Gabor, Mooch's mentor and friend.

The film features cameos from many of the top film and television stars of the era, who appear as themselves. This includes Vincent Price,  James Darren, Jill St. John, Phyllis Diller, Sam Jaffe, Rose Marie, Dick Martin, Darren McGavin, Edward G. Robinson, Cesar Romero, Dean Martin (voice only) and Mickey Rooney.

The animals that appeared in Mooch Goes to Hollywood were supplied and trained by Frank Inn. The bevy of animals at the veterinarian included a monkey, goat, cat, donkey and duck. Mooch's various costumes came from Frederick's of Hollywood. The title song, with lyrics by Ann Nicolaysen was sung by Sonny Curtis.

Reception
Mooch Goes to Hollywood was considered "family-friendly" fare and with so many cameo appearances was likely to gain an audience with adults as well as children. Reviews, however, were not kind. Film critic Leonard Maltin slated the film, lamenting films of the 1970s where Vincent Price was being given "fewer good parts" and often appeared on television, "even spoof[ing] his own image". Publisher John Soltes went even further in describing Mooch Goes to Hollywood as "one of those unfortunate resume bullets for Zsa Zsa Gabor, James Darren, Vincent Price, Jill St. John, Jim Backus and Mickey Rooney. The 51-minute television special from 1971 is a pointless exercise in dull family entertainment. It provides some laughs, but always for unintended reasons."

Legacy
Nearly 50 years after its initial TV airing, Mooch Goes to Hollywood received its theatrical world premiere at Beyond Fest on October 2, 2019, held at the Egyptian Theatre in Hollywood. All three sold-out screenings were presented on 16mm and featured an introduction by American Cinematheque programmer and "Moochologist" Grant Moninger.

References

Notes

Bibliography

 Maltin, Leonard. Leonard Maltin's Movie Encyclopedia. New York: Dutton, 1994. .

External links
 
 

1971 films
Films about dogs
1971 comedy films
American comedy television films
1970s English-language films
1970s American films